Agnete Gullestad Haaland (born 10 March 1960) is a Norwegian stage and film actress, organizational leader and theatre director.

She was born in Bergen, and is a daughter of actress Anne Gullestad.

From 2000 to 2011 she chaired the Norwegian Actors' Equity Association. She was appointed theatre director at the Bergen theatre Den Nationale Scene from 2012.

References

External links 
 

1960 births
Living people
Trade unionists from Bergen
Norwegian stage actresses
Norwegian film actresses
Norwegian theatre directors
Theatre people from Bergen
Actors from Bergen